This is a list of all tornadoes that were confirmed by local offices of the National Weather Service in the United States in November and December 2010.

United States yearly total

November

 One tornado was confirmed in the final totals, but does not have a listed rating.

November 3 event

November 17 event

November 22 event

November 23 event

November 24 event

November 25 event

November 26 event

November 29 event

November 30 event

December

December 1 event

December 14 event

December 30 event

December 31 event

See also 
 Tornadoes of 2010

Notes

References 

 11
2010, 11
Tornadoes
Tornadoes